Bistanta is a monotypic genus of praying mantises in the family Thespidae. It is represented by a single species, Bistanta mexicana.

See also
List of mantis genera and species

References

Bactromantis
Insects of Mexico